Salvia nubicola is a herbaceous perennial native to a wide region that includes Afghanistan, Bhutan, India, Pakistan, southwest Asia, and Europe. It is especially common in the Muktinath Valley, and is used in traditional Tibetan medicine.

The specific epithet nubicola means "dweller among the clouds," referring to its high mountain habitat. For many years, it was considered the same plant as the similar European Salvia glutinosa (Sticky sage).

The petiole is typically about the same length as the leaf blade. The calyx is bright green, hairy, sticky, and glandular, giving off a medicinal odor when rubbed, described by one author as "resembling the distinct odour of a billy-goat," all of which cause animals to avoid it in its native habitat.

Notes

nubicola
Flora of Afghanistan
Flora of the Indian subcontinent
Sowa Rigpa medicaments
Plants described in 1830